Harrison Forman (1904-1978) was an American photographer and journalist. He wrote for The New York Times and National Geographic. During World War II he reported from China and interviewed Mao Zedong.

He graduated from the University of Wisconsin with a degree in Oriental Philosophy. Forman and his wife Sandra had a son, John, who later changed the spelling of his name to Foreman, and a daughter, Brenda-Lu Forman, who collaborated with her father on one of his books, and also wrote a series of children's books on given names.

His collection of diaries and fifty thousand photographs are now at American Geographical Society Library at University of Wisconsin–Milwaukee.

Forman who travelled to the Tibetan Plateau in 1932 and filmed the Panchen Lama at the Labrang Monastery in Xiahe, Gansu province,  served as the Tibetan technical expert on Frank Capra's Lost Horizon film of 1937.

Books 

1931: Do You Want to Fly?. Shanghai: The Comacrib Press
1935: Through Forbidden Tibet. New York: Longmans & Co.; London: Longmans, Green
1942: Horizon Hunter: the adventures of a modern Marco Polo. London: Robert Hale
1945: Report from Red China. New York: Holt
1948: Changing China. New York: Crown Publishers
1952: How to make Money with your Camera. New York: McGraw-Hill
1964: The Land and People of Nigeria. Philadelphia: Lippincott (with Brenda-Lu Forman)

References

External links 

1978 deaths
1904 births
American photojournalists
National Geographic Society
The New York Times visual journalists
Journalists from Wisconsin
Artists from Milwaukee
University of Wisconsin–Madison alumni
20th-century American journalists
American male journalists
American expatriates in China